Gros may refer to:

People
Gros (surname)
 Gross (surname), the German variant of Gros
 Le Gros, the Norman variant of Gros

Other uses
 Gros (coinage), a type of 13th-century silver coinage of France
 Gros (grape), another name for Elbling, a variety of white grape
 Groș, a village of the city of Hunedoara, Transylvania, Romania
 General Register Office for Scotland (GROS)

See also
 Gros Morne (disambiguation)
 
 Gross (disambiguation)
 Grosz (disambiguation)